Ephialtias abrupta is a moth of the  family Notodontidae. It is found in from the lower Amazon (Pará) in Brazil.

The species is sexually dimorphic.

External links
Species page at Tree of Life project

Notodontidae of South America
Moths described in 1806